Italispidea is a genus of flies in the family Tachinidae.

Species
Italispidea antennalis Townsend, 1927
Italispidea charapense (Townsend, 1927)
Italispidea gagatina (Wulp, 1890)
Italispidea uruhuasi (Townsend, 1927)

References

Diptera of North America
Diptera of South America
Exoristinae
Tachinidae genera
Taxa named by Charles Henry Tyler Townsend